Ruacana Falls is a  waterfalls located in Ruacana, Omusati on the Kunene River in Northern Namibia. It is among the largest waterfalls in Africa, both by volume and width.

Description 
The Kunene river, a border river between Namibia and Angola plunge into a 120 metre deep and 700 metre wide gorge which forms the Ruacana Falls.

References

Waterfalls of Namibia
Waterfalls of Angola
Omusati Region